Maria Anikanova (25 November 1916 – 2005) was a Soviet female speed skater. She won a silver medal at the World Allround Speed Skating Championships for Women in 1952.

References

External links

1916 births
2005 deaths
Soviet female speed skaters
World Allround Speed Skating Championships medalists